The Royal Family Order of George VI is an honour that was bestowed on female members of the British royal family by King George VI.

Princess Alexandra is the only surviving recipient, having been appointed in 1951.

Appearance
The insignia, an enamel portrait of the king surrounded by diamonds, is worn on a bow of rose pink ribbon.

It was provided in two different sizes: the largest version was bestowed on the King's wife and mother, and size two to the other recipients. The first examples were presented two days before the 1937 Coronation, at a family luncheon.

List of known recipients
Size 1:
 Queen Elizabeth The Queen Mother, George VI's wife
 Queen Mary, George VI's mother

Size 2:
 Elizabeth II, George VI's elder daughter
 Princess Margaret, Countess of Snowdon, George VI's younger daughter
 Mary, Princess Royal, and Countess of Harewood, George VI's sister  
 Princess Alice, Duchess of Gloucester, George VI's sister-in-law
 Princess Marina, Duchess of Kent, George VI's sister-in-law 
 Princess Alexandra, The Honourable Lady Ogilvy, George VI's niece

See also
 Royal Family Order of George IV
 Royal Order of Victoria and Albert
 Royal Family Order of Edward VII
 Royal Family Order of George V
 Royal Family Order of Elizabeth II

References

Royal family orders
Orders of chivalry of the United Kingdom
George VI
British royal family